Kalateh-ye Hasanabad (also Romanized as Kalāteh-ye Ḩasanābād) is a village in Eshqabad Rural District, Miyan Jolgeh District, Nishapur County, Razavi Khorasan Province, Iran. At the 2006 census, its population was 440, in 111 families.

References 

Populated places in Nishapur County